Bob Kiss (born April 1, 1947) is a Vermont politician and former 39th Mayor of Burlington, Vermont. Kiss was a member of the Vermont House of Representatives from January 2001 until he stepped down to assume office as mayor of Burlington, following his election to that office in March 2006. He is a member of the Vermont Progressive Party. Kiss won re-election in 2009, and was endorsed by Vermont's Independent U.S. Senator Bernie Sanders. In November 2011, Kiss announced that he would not seek re-election in the 2012 Burlington mayoral election.

Biography 
Kiss has blue-collar roots, having grown up as the son of a union worker in Kenosha, Wisconsin. He was a high school basketball player and captain of the tennis team. After having graduated with a B.A. in political science from Knox College in 1969, he joined the Peace Corps, where he trained in Malaysia for 14 weeks. Although called up by a draft board for military service, he was granted conscientious objector status and performed alternative service at a hospital in Boston.

Since 1971, when he moved to Burlington, he has been working in the human services field. In 1981, Kiss was hired as director of the Community Action program for Chittenden County, a low-income advocacy group. Six years later, he became head of Community Action's umbrella organization, the Champlain Valley Office of Economic Opportunity. Kiss remained head of the CVOEO until 1999. He also served on the boards of the Burlington Housing authority and the committee on temporary shelter during this time.

Political life

Legislative record 
Kiss was elected to a seat in the Vermont House of Representatives in 2000 as the standard-bearer of the Progressive Party. He quickly earned the respect of his colleagues and was subsequently anointed leader of the Progressive Party Caucus. He sponsored legislation on whistle blower protection for health care workers, rental housing health and safety, and outdoor lighting.

Kiss represented the Chittenden 3-4 House district. He stepped down from the legislature on April 1, 2006 after being elected mayor of Burlington. Governor James Douglas appointed Christopher Pearson, also a Progressive, to serve the remainder of Kiss's term.

Mayor of Burlington 

Kiss was elected mayor of Burlington on March 7, 2006. In the election, he prevailed over opponents Hinda Miller, Democrat, and Kevin Curley, Republican. With his election Kiss became the second Vermont Progressive to be elected to the office (Peter Clavelle was the first). Bernie Sanders, who is associated with the party but not a member, had been elected to this office prior to Clavelle. Kiss won re-election in 2009 to a second term as Burlington mayor by edging Republican City Council President Kurt Wright in the third round of instant-runoff voting after receiving 29% of the first round votes.

During his re-election campaign Kiss was endorsed by Vermont's Independent U.S. Senator Bernie Sanders. After re-election Mayor Kiss and the City of Burlington faced significant challenges related to Burlington Telecom, a city-owned and operated fiber-to-the-home telecommunications enterprise. Burlington Telecom is currently in proceedings at the Vermont Public Service Board for being out of compliance with its Certificate of Public Good because of its use of the City's pooled cash account. Also related to the use of pooled cash, the City defended a taxpayer lawsuit in Chittenden County Superior Court, which was dismissed in October 2012. In addition, Burlington was sued in federal court by Citibank, related to the lease-purchase agreement for Burlington Telecom. The city owes Citibank over $33 million. Over this period the City of Burlington's credit rating has been downgraded by Moody's, reflecting the financial challenges posed by Burlington Telecom. Throughout this time, the telecom entity has continued to provide its fiber-to-the-home services to Burlington residents and businesses.

Vermont Senate candidacy 
Kiss announced in May 2012 he would run as an independent for the Vermont Senate. Kiss finished 8th of 14 candidates running for six seats.

Affiliations 
As mayor, Kiss was a member of the Mayors Against Illegal Guns Coalition, a bi-partisan group with a stated goal of "making the public safer by getting illegal guns off the streets." The Coalition was co-chaired by Boston Mayor Thomas Menino and New York City Mayor Michael Bloomberg.

Personal 
Bob lives in a Burlington duplex with his companion of more than 30 years, Jackie Majoros.

See also 
 List of elected socialist mayors in the United States

References

External links 
 Burlington Mayor website
 Bob Kiss for Mayor Campaign website
 Bob Kiss For Mayor YouTube channel
 Bob Kiss for Mayor Facebook page

|-

|-

|-

Living people
Members of the Vermont House of Representatives
1947 births
Politicians from Kenosha, Wisconsin
Mayors of Burlington, Vermont
Vermont Progressive Party politicians
Knox College (Illinois) alumni
American socialists
Vermont socialists
Wisconsin socialists